Major General Sir George Frederick Wootten,  (1 May 1893 – 31 March 1970) was a senior Australian Army officer, public servant, right wing political activist and solicitor. He rose to the rank of temporary major general during the Second World War. Wootten earned the respect of his soldiers and superiors; General Douglas MacArthur described him as "the best soldier in the Australian Army who had it in him to reach the highest position". He was famous, in part, for his heavy build; he had given up smoking in 1930, and by 1941—even though he was 175 cm (5 ft 9 in) tall—he weighed 127 kg (20 st).

Early life

Wootten was born on 1 May 1893 in Marrickville, Sydney, Australia. He was the seventh child of English, London-born migrant parents, William Frederick Wootten (a carpenter and later a civil engineer) and Louisa Wootten, née Old. George Wootten attended Fort Street Model School in Sydney.

He entered the Royal Military College, Duntroon, in 1911, and graduated in August 1914 as a lieutenant.

First World War
Wootten's graduation coincided with the outbreak of the First World War. He was posted to the 1st Battalion, went ashore at Gallipoli on 25 April 1915, and was promoted to captain in May that year. He was a major by December.

Wootten later served on the Western Front. He was brigade major with the 11th Brigade, then with the 9th Brigade (under Brigadier General Charles Rosenthal). Wootten was awarded the Distinguished Service Order in October 1917 for staff work. He was then appointed to the staff of the 5th Division. In October 1918, he was appointed to the staff of Field Marshal Sir Douglas Haig, commander of the British Expeditionary Force on the Western Front. Wootten was mentioned in despatches four times.

Following the end of hostilities, Wootten was sent to the Staff College, Camberley, England, in March 1919.

Civilian life between the wars
Wootten married Muriel Frances Anna Bisgood, a nurse, at St Joseph's Catholic Church, Roehampton, London, on 3 January 1920. Wootten was posted back to Australia that same year.

He resigned his commission in 1923, and moved back to London, where he worked as manager of a clothing factory.

Wootten returned to New South Wales in 1926 and became an articled clerk at West Wyalong. He was also recruited by a secret, quasi-official militia organisation, the Old Guard, which had been formed in response to fears of a supposed communist revolutionary threat. Wootten was admitted as a solicitor in July 1930, by which time he had four children. In 1931 he became an organiser for the Old Guard in Sydney and after retiring from the army, was one of its handful of full-time staff.

Wootten joined the Citizen Military Forces (CMF; the army reserve corps) and on 1 July 1937—as a lieutenant colonel—was appointed commander of the 21st Light Horse Regiment.

Second World War
Following the outbreak of the Second World War, on 13 October 1939, Wootten was seconded to the Second Australian Imperial Force, and from 24 October 1939 until 9 February 1940 he commanded the 2/2nd Infantry Battalion. He then served as acting commander of the 16th Infantry Brigade until 20 May 1940.

I Corps was attached to the British Middle East Command, and when an AIF Reinforcement Depot was set up in Palestine, in late 1940, Wootten was promoted to temporary brigadier and made its commander.

Wootten was promoted to brigadier, and from 1 February 1941, he commanded the 18th Infantry Brigade (7th Division), on active service in the North African campaign, including the siege of Tobruk.

Following the outbreak of war with Japan, the 7th Division returned to Australia and the 18th Brigade was part of the historic victory over Japanese forces at Milne Bay. This was followed by the fierce and costly fighting at Buna and Sanananda.

On 15 March 1943, Wootten was promoted to temporary major general and became General Officer Commanding, 9th Australian Infantry Division. Between September that year and January 1944 he led the 9th Division in the Battle of Lae and the Huon Peninsula campaign.

After a year of leave, consolidation, and re-training in Australia, the 9th took part in the Borneo campaign, including Operation Oboe Six, the amphibious landings at Brunei and Labuan.

Wootten's nephew, Driver Evans, was a prisoner of war in Borneo who took part in one of the Sandakan death marches, and was killed at Ranau.

Following the Japanese surrender in August 1945, Wootten commanded the British Borneo Civil Affairs Unit, overseeing the recuperation and repatriation of Allied prisoners, surrendered Japanese personnel, and the transition back to civilian rule.

Wootten returned to Sydney on 22 September, and transferred to the Reserve of Officers on 14 October. However, he was soon appointed to a military court of inquiry into Major General Gordon Bennett's departure from Singapore in 1942.

In 1945–58, Wootten chaired the Repatriation Commission, in Melbourne. He commanded the 3rd Division (CMF), in 1947–50 and was the CMF member of the Military Board in 1948–50. After retiring from the commission in 1958, he returned to Sydney.

Wootten died at the Repatriation General Hospital, Concord in 1970. He is buried beside his wife at the Macquarie Park (Northern Suburbs) Cemetery, Lane Cove, northern Sydney.

Honours
In recognition of his wartime service, Wootten was appointed a Companion of the Order of the Bath, Commander of the Order of the British Empire, and Companion of the Distinguished Service Order with Bar.  He was also awarded the US Distinguished Service Cross and Mentioned in Despatches four times.  He was elevated to a Knight Commander of the Order of the British Empire (KBE) in 1958.

A 1956 portrait of Wootten by Sir William Dargie is held at the Australian War Memorial, Canberra.

Footnotes

References and external links

Wall, Don (no date, post-1993) Kill the Prisoners!  Mona Vale, NSW, Australia: Don Wall  
Australian War Memorial, "Honours and awards (gazetted) George Frederick Wootten" Access date: 19 April 2007.
generals.dk " Wootten, Sir George Frederick, Major-General (1893–1970)" Access date: 19 April 2007.
Australian World War Two Nominal Roll, "WOOTTEN, GEORGE FREDERICK"  Access date: 19 April 2007.
ordersofbattle.com, "George Frederick Wootten"  Access date: 19 April 2007.

|-

1893 births
1970 deaths
Australian activists
Australian Anglicans
Australian Companions of the Distinguished Service Order
Australian Companions of the Order of the Bath
Australian generals
Australian Knights Commander of the Order of the British Empire
Australian military personnel of World War I
Australian Army personnel of World War II
Australian people of English descent
Australian solicitors
Graduates of the Staff College, Camberley
Military personnel from New South Wales
People from Marrickville
Recipients of the Distinguished Service Cross (United States)
Royal Military College, Duntroon graduates
Secretaries of the Australian Government Veterans' Affairs Department